August Clarence Swensen (December 29, 1917 – February 25, 2009) was an American actor and was one of the Munchkins in the 1939 film The Wizard of Oz.

Early life
Swensen was born in 1917 and grew up in Austin, Texas. He was not allowed to attend a public school until he was nine because of his size.

Biography
At 4ft 6in, he played one of the 25 Munchkin soldiers in the 1939 film The Wizard of Oz.

He also appeared in The Terror of Tiny Town as a preacher. Many of his Oz co-stars were cast members of this Western musical film. He wore a chimp suit for Tarzan Finds a Son! with Johnny Weissmuller.

His wife Myrna was also up for a part in The Wizard of Oz, but illness forced her to miss the opportunity.

After experiencing a stroke in 2005, he was unable to walk and ended up in a wheelchair as a result. He experienced poor health then after but still attended many events with the other surviving Munchkins, including the presentation of the Munchkins' star on the Hollywood Walk of Fame in 2007.

Death
Swensen died on February 25, 2009, at the age of 91. He outlived every major cast member of The Wizard of Oz.

Filmography

References

External links

1917 births
2009 deaths
American male film actors
Male actors from Austin, Texas
20th-century American male actors
Actors with dwarfism